Carmen Covito (born 14 November 1948 in Castellammare di Stabia, Province of Naples) is an Italian writer and translator. Her novels include La bruttina stagionata (Bompiani 1992, translated into Spanish, German, French, Dutch, and Greek), Del perché i porcospini attraversano la strada (Bompiani 1995), Benvenuti in questo ambiente (Bompiani 1997) and La rossa e il nero (Mondadori 2002).

External links
Public domain self-published eBook: Tales from the Web (translation by E. Guidi, 2001).

1948 births
Living people
20th-century Italian novelists
People from Castellammare di Stabia
Bancarella Prize winners